Edo, also romanized as Jedo, Yedo or Yeddo, is the former name of Tokyo.

Edo, formerly a jōkamachi (castle town) centered on Edo Castle located in Musashi Province, became the de facto capital of Japan from 1603 as the seat of the Tokugawa shogunate. Edo grew to become one of the largest cities in the world under the Tokugawa.
After the Meiji Restoration in 1868 the Meiji government renamed Edo as Tokyo ("Eastern Capital") and relocated the Emperor from the historic capital of Kyoto to the city. The era of Tokugawa rule in Japan from 1603 to 1868 is known as the Edo period.

History

Before Tokugawa 
Before the 10th century, there is no mention of Edo in historical records, but for a few settlements in the area. Edo first appears in the Azuma Kagami chronicles, that name for the area being probably used since the second half of the Heian period. A descendant of the head of the Chichibu clan settled in the area and took the name , likely based on the name used for the place, and founded the Edo clan. Shigetsugu built a fortified residence, probably around the tip of the Musashino terrace, which would become the Edo castle. Shigetsugu's son, took the Taira's side against Minamoto no Yoritomo in 1180 but eventually surrendered to Minamoto and became a gokenin for the Kamakura shogunate. At the fall of the shogunate in the 14th century, the Edo clan took the side of the Southern court, and its influence declined during the Muromachi period.

In 1456, a vassal of the Ōgigayatsu branch of the Uesugi clan, started to build a castle on the former fortified residence of the Edo clan and took the name Ōta Dōkan. Dōkan lived in this castle until his assassination in 1486. Under Dōkan, with good water connections to Kamakura, Odawara and other parts of Kanto and the country, Edo expanded in a jokamachi, with the castle bordering a cove opening into Edo Bay (current Hibiya Park) and the town developing along the Hirakawa River that was flowing into the cove, as well as the stretch of land on the eastern side of the cove (roughly where current Tokyo Station is) called . Some priests and scholars fleeing Kyoto after the Ōnin War came to Edo during that period.

After the death of Dōkan, the castle became one of strongholds of the Uesugi clan, which fell to the Later Hōjō clan at the battle of Takanawahara in 1524, during the expansion of their rule over the Kantō area. When the Hōjō clan was finally defeated by Toyotomi Hideyoshi in 1590, the Kanto area was given to rule to Toyotomi's senior officer Tokugawa Ieyasu, who took his residence in Edo.

Tokugawa era 

Tokugawa Ieyasu emerged as the paramount warlord of the Sengoku period following his victory at the Battle of Sekigahara in October 1600. He formally founded the Tokugawa shogunate in 1603 and established his headquarters at Edo Castle. Edo became the center of political power and de facto capital of Japan, although the historic capital of Kyoto remained the de jure capital as the seat of the emperor. Edo transformed from a fishing village in Musashi Province in 1457 into the largest metropolis in the world with an estimated population of 1,000,000 by 1721.Edo was repeatedly and regularly devastated by fires, the Great fire of Meireki in 1657 being the most disastrous, with an estimated 100,000 victims and a vast portion of the city completely burnt. At the time, the population of Edo was around 300,000, and the impact of the fire was tremendous. The fire destroyed the central keep of Edo Castle, which was never rebuilt, and it influenced the urban planning afterwards to make the city more resilient with many empty areas to break spreading fires and wider streets. Reconstruction efforts expanded the city east of the Sumida River, and some daimyō residences were relocated to give more space to the city, especially in the direct vicinity of the shogun's residence, giving birth to a large green space beside the castle, present-day Fukiage gardens of the Imperial Palace. During the Edo period, there were about 100 major fires mostly begun by accident and often quickly escalating and spreading through neighborhoods of wooden nagaya which were heated with charcoal fires.

In 1868, the Tokugawa shogunate was overthrown in the Meiji Restoration by supporters of Emperor Meiji and his Imperial Court in Kyoto, ending Edo's status as the de facto capital of Japan. However, the new Meiji government soon renamed Edo to Tōkyō (東京, "Eastern Capital") and the city became the formal capital of Japan when the emperor moved his residence to the city.

Urbanism
Very quickly after its inception, the shogunate undertook major works in Edo that drastically changed the topography of the area, notably under the  nationwide program of major civil works involving the now pacified daimyō workforce. The Hibiya cove facing the castle was soon filled after the arrival of Ieyasu, the Hirakawa river was diverted, and several protective moats and logistical canals were dug (including the Kanda river), to limit the risks of flooding. Landfill works on the bay began, with several areas reclaimed during the duration of the shogunate (notably the Tsukiji area). East of the city and of the Sumida River, a massive network of canals was dug.

Fresh water was a major issue, as direct wells would provide brackish water because of the location of the city over an estuary. The few fresh water ponds of the city were put to use, and a network of canals and underground wooden pipes bringing freshwater from the western side of the city and the Tama River was built. Some of this infrastructure was used until the 20th century.

General layout of the city 
The city was laid out as a castle town around Edo Castle, which was positioned at the tip of the Musashino terrace. The area in the immediate proximity of the castle consisted of samurai and daimyō residences, whose families lived in Edo as part of the sankin-kōtai system; the daimyō made journeys in alternating years to Edo and used the residences for their entourages. The location of each residence was carefully attributed depending on their position as tozama, shinpan or fudai. It was this extensive organization of the city for the samurai class which defined the character of Edo, particularly in contrast to the two major cities of Kyoto and Osaka, neither of which were ruled by a daimyō or had a significant samurai population. Kyoto's character was defined by the Imperial Court, the court nobles, its Buddhist temples and its history; Osaka was the country's commercial center, dominated by the chōnin or the merchant class. On the contrary, the samurai and daimyō residences occupied up to 70% of the area of Edo. On the east and northeast sides of the castle lived the  including the chōnin in a much more densely populated area than the samurai class area, organized in a series of gated communities called machi (町, "town" or "village"). This area, Shitamachi (下町, "lower town" or "lower towns"), was the center of urban and merchant culture. Shomin also lived along the main roads leading in and out of the city. The Sumida River, then called the Great River (大川, Ōkawa), ran on the eastern side of the city. The shogunate's official rice-storage warehouses and other official buildings were located here.

The  marked the center of the city's commercial center and the starting point of the gokaidō (thus making it the de facto "center of the country"). Fishermen, craftsmen and other producers and retailers operated here. Shippers managed ships known as tarubune to and from Osaka and other cities, bringing goods into the city or transferring them from sea routes to river barges or land routes.

The northeastern corner of the city was considered dangerous in the traditional onmyōdō cosmology and was protected from evil by a number of temples including Sensō-ji and Kan'ei-ji, one of the two tutelary Bodaiji temples of the Tokugawa. A path and a canal, a short distance north of Sensō-ji, extended west from the Sumida riverbank leading along the northern edge of the city to the Yoshiwara pleasure district. Previously located near Ningyōchō, the district was rebuilt in this more remote location after the great fire of Meireki. Danzaemon, the hereditary position head of eta, or outcasts, who performed "unclean" works in the city resided nearby.

Temples and shrines occupied roughly 15% of the surface of the city, equivalent to the living areas of the townspeople, with however an average of one-tenth of its population. Temples and shrines were spread out over the city. Besides the large concentration in the northeast side to protect the city, the second Bodaiji of the Tokugawa, Zōjō-ji occupied a large area south of the castle.

Housing

Military caste 
The samurai and daimyōs residential estates varied dramatically in size depending on their status. Some daimyōs could have several of those residences in Edo. The , was the main residence while the lord was in Edo and was used for official duties. It was not necessarily the largest of his residences, but the most convenient to commute to the castle. The upper residence also acted as the representative embassy of the domain in Edo, connecting the shogunate and the clan. The shogunate did not exercise its investigative powers inside the precincts of the residential estate of the upper residence, which could also act as a refuge. The estate of the upper residence was attributed by the shogunate according to the status of the clan and its relation with the Shogun. The , a bit further from the castle, could house the heir of the lord, his servants from his fief when he was in Edo for the sankin-kotai alternate residency, or be a hiding residence if needed. The , if there was any, was on the outskirts of town, more of a pleasure retreat with gardens. The lower residence could also be used as a retreat for the lord if a fire had devastated the city. Some of the powerful daimyōs residences occupied vast grounds of several dozens of hectares. Maintenance and operations of those residential estates could be extremely expensive. Samurai in service of a specific clan would normally live in the residence of their lord.

The hatamoto samurais, in direct service of the Shogun, would have their own residences, usually located behind the castle on the Western side in the Banchō area.

Shonin 

In a strict sense of the word, chōnin were only the townspeople who owned their residence, which was actually a minority. The shonin population mainly lived in semi-collective housings called , multi-rooms wooden dwellings, organized in enclosed , with communal facilities, such as wells connected to the city's fresh water distribution system, garbage collection area and communal bathrooms. A typical machi was of rectangular shape and could have a population of several hundred.

Two floor buildings and larger shops, reserved to the higher-ranking members of the society, were facing the main street. A machi would typically follow a grid pattern and smaller streets, were opening on the main street, also with (sometimes) two-floor buildings, shop on the first floor, living quarter on the second floor, for the more well-off residents. Rentals and smaller rooms for lower ranked shonin were located in those back housings.

Government and administration
Edo's municipal government was under the responsibility of the rōjū, the senior officials which oversaw the entire bakufu – the government of the Tokugawa shogunate. The administrative definition of Edo was called .

The Kanjō-bugyō (finance commissioners) were responsible for the financial matters of the shogunate, whereas the Jisha-Bugyō handled matters related to shrines and temples. The  were samurai (at the very beginning of the shogunate daimyōs, later hatamoto) officials appointed to keep the order in the city, with the word designating both the heading magistrate, the magistrature and its organization. They were in charge of Edo's day-to-day administration, combining the role of police, judge and fire brigade. There were two offices, the South Machi-Bugyō and the North Machi-Bugyō, which had the same geographical jurisdiction in spite of their name but rotated roles on a monthly basis. Despite their extensive responsibilities, the teams of the Machi-Bugyō were rather small, with 2 offices of 125 people each. The Machi-Bugyō did not have jurisdiction over the samurai residential areas, which remained under the shogunate direct rule. The geographical jurisdiction of the Machi-Bugyō did not exactly coincide with the Gofunai, creating some complexity on the handling on the matters of the city. 
The Machi-bugyō oversaw the numerous Machi where shonin lived through representatives called . Each Machi had a Machi leader called , who reported to a  who himself was in charge of several Machis.

See also

 Edo society
 Fires in Edo
 1703 Genroku earthquake
 Edokko (native of Edo)
 History of Tokyo
 Iki (a Japanese aesthetic ideal)
 Asakusa

Notes

References
 Forbes, Andrew; Henley, David (2014). 100 Famous Views of Edo. Chiang Mai: Cognoscenti Books. ASIN: B00HR3RHUY
 Gordon, Andrew. (2003). A Modern History of Japan from Tokugawa Times to the Present. Oxford: Oxford University Press.  / (cloth); /.
 Ponsonby-Fane, Richard. (1956). Kyoto: the Old Capital, 794–1869. Kyoto: Ponsonby Memorial Society.
 Sansom, George. (1963). A History of Japan: 1615–1867. Stanford: Stanford University Press. /.
 Akira Naito (Author), Kazuo Hozumi. Edo, the City that Became Tokyo: An Illustrated History. Kodansha International, Tokyo (2003). 
 Alternate spelling from 1911 Encyclopædia Britannica article.

External links

 A Trip to Old Edo
   Fukagawa Edo Museum
 Map of Bushū Toshima District, Edo from 1682

 
Edo period
History of Tokyo
Populated places established in the 1450s
1457 establishments in Asia
1450s establishments in Japan
1868 disestablishments in Japan